The 2017 World Snooker Championship (officially the 2017 Betfred World Snooker Championship) was a professional snooker tournament that took place from 15 April to 1 May 2017 at the Crucible Theatre in Sheffield, England. It was the 19th and final ranking event of the 2016–17 season which followed the China Open. It was the 41st consecutive year that the World Snooker Championship had been held at the Crucible.

The winner of the event was the defending champion and world number one Mark Selby, who defeated John Higgins 18–15 in the final. Selby won despite having fallen 4–10 behind in the second session of the match. Selby defeated Ding Junhui 17–15 in the semi-finals whilst Higgins defeated Barry Hawkins 17–8 to reach the final. This was Selby's third World Championship win; he had also won the tournament in the 2014 and 2016 tournaments.

The total prize fund for the championship was £1,750,000, the winner receiving the top prize of £375,000. There were 74 century breaks in the main stage of the championship, and a further 84 in qualifying. Gary Wilson scored a maximum break of 147 in qualifying during his first round win over Josh Boileau. The tournament was broadcast in Europe by the BBC and Eurosport, and internationally by World Snooker on Facebook.

Overview
The World Snooker Championship is an annual cue sport tournament and the official world championship of the game of snooker. Founded in the late 19th century by British Army soldiers stationed in India, the sport was popular in Great Britain. In modern times it has been played worldwide, especially in East and Southeast Asian nations such as China, Hong Kong and Thailand.

The 2017 tournament featured 32 professional players competing in one-on-one snooker matches played over several , using a single elimination format. The 32 players were selected for the event through a mix of the snooker world rankings, and a pre-tournament qualification competition. The first world championship in 1927 was won by Joe Davis, the final being held in Camkin's Hall, Birmingham, England. Since 1977, the event has been held at the Crucible Theatre in Sheffield, England. , Stephen Hendry and  Ronnie O’Sullivan are the event's most successful participants in the modern era, having both won the championship seven times. Mark Selby had won the previous year's championship by defeating China's Ding Junhui in the final 18–14. This was Selby's second world title, having also won the championship in 2014. The event was organised by World Snooker, a subsidiary of the World Professional Billiards and Snooker Association, and sponsored by sports betting company Betfred.

Format
The 2017 World Snooker Championship took place between 15 April and 1 May 2017 in Sheffield, England. The tournament was the last of 19 ranking events in the 2016–17 snooker season on the World Snooker Tour. It featured a 32-player main draw that was held at the Crucible Theatre, as well as a 128-player qualifying draw that was played at the English Institute of Sport, Sheffield, from 5 to 12 April, concluding three days before the start of the main draw. This was the 41st consecutive year that the tournament had been staged at the Crucible, and it was the 49th successive world championship to be contested using the modern knockout format.

The top 16 players in the latest world rankings automatically qualified for the main draw as seeded players. Mark Selby was seeded first overall as the defending champion, and the remaining 15 seeds were allocated based on the world rankings released after the China Open. The number of frames required to win a match increased with each proceeding round of the main draw, the first round consisting of best-of-19 frames matches, the final match being played over a maximum of 35 frames.

All 16 non-seeded spots in the main draw were filled with players from the qualifying rounds. The draw for the qualifying competition consisted of 128 players, including 110 of the remaining 112 players on the World Snooker Tour, as well as 18 wildcard places assigned to non-tour players. These invited players included the women's world champion, the European junior champion, and all four semi-finalists at the WSF world amateur championship. Half of the participants in the qualifying draw were seeded players: those ranked from 17th to 80th were allocated one of 64 seeds in world ranking order; the other participants were placed randomly into the draw. To reach the main draw at the Crucible, players were required to win three best-of-19 frames qualifying matches.

Prize fund
The total prize money for the event was raised to £1,750,000 from the previous year's prize fund of £1,500,100. The winner of the event won £375,000. A breakdown of prize money for the 2017 World Snooker Championship is shown below.

Winner: £375,000
Runner-up: £160,000
Semi-final: £75,000
Quarter-final: £37,500
Last 16: £25,000
Last 32: £16,000
Last 48: £12,000
Last 80: £8,000
Total: £1,750,000

The "rolling 147 prize" awarded for a maximum break was £5,000, which was won by Gary Wilson in qualifying.

Coverage
The 2017 World Snooker Championship was broadcast throughout Europe by both BBC TV and Eurosport. The tournament was streamed internationally on Facebook for the first time, specifically for portions of South America and Asia. The event was also broadcast in North America on Facebook, and the final was aired on the Eleven Sports Network.

Tournament summary

Seeding and qualifying rounds

The top 16 ranked players in the world automatically qualified as seeds for the first round of the main stage at the Crucible. Defending champion Mark Selby was seeded first and the other 15 seeding allocations were based on the latest world rankings from after the China Open. The players ranked from 17th position entered the competition in the first round of qualifying and were required to win three best-of-19 frames matches to qualify for the main tournament. The three qualifying rounds were held at the Ponds Forge International Sports Centre in Sheffield from 5 to 12 April 2017.

Two-time world champion Mark Williams took part in qualifying, having failed to regain his place in the top 16. He lost 7–10 to Stuart Carrington in his third qualifying match and missed the knockout stage for only the second time since 1996. Williams qualified at the following year's event, where he defeated John Higgins 18–16 in the final to win his third world title.

The deciding frame of the third-round qualifying match between Fergal O'Brien and David Gilbert on 12 April was the longest frame on record in the modern era of the game; lasting for 123 minutes and 41 seconds, it broke the previous record of 100 minutes and 24 seconds set by Alan McManus and Barry Pinches in 2015. Gary Wilson made the 131st officially recognised maximum break, the second of his career, in the fourth frame of his first-round qualifying match against Josh Boileau on 6 April. Wilson was one of five players to qualify for the main stage of the championship at the Crucible for the first time, the other four debutants being David Grace, Noppon Saengkham, Yan Bingtao, and Zhou Yuelong. The draw for the first round of the main competition took place at 10:00 a.m. BST on 13 April 2017.

First round

The first round of the championship took place between 15 and 20 April 2017. All matches were played as best-of-19 frames held over two sessions. Having been eliminated in the first round at the Crucible in the four years since his 2012 semi-final appearance, Stephen Maguire defeated fellow Scot Anthony McGill  to progress to the second round for the first time in five years. In his 25th consecutive appearance at the World Championship, Ronnie O'Sullivan withstood a fightback from qualifier Gary Wilson—who had recovered from  down to  down—to win their first round match . In doing so, O'Sullivan secured a place in the last 16 for the 14th year in a row, equalling the record set by Terry Griffiths in 1996.

Elsewhere, Marco Fu trailed Luca Brecel 0–5, 1–7 and 4–8 before winning 10–9 in the first round. Third seed Stuart Bingham played 2002 world champion Peter Ebdon, who was appearing at the Crucible for the 24th time since first qualifying in 1992. He won just one more frame before losing 5–10 to Bingham.

Qualifier Rory McLeod defeated second seed Judd Trump 10–8 after trailing 0–4. Before the tournament Trump had declared that he "honestly believe [he] can play to a standard which is very rare nowadays," and that he was "the best" in the world. His poor performance in the match, which ran into a third session, was exacerbated by a shoulder injury that was causing him visible pain when down on shots. This resulted in 46-year-old McLeod becoming the oldest player to reach the last 16 since Steve Davis' quarter-final run in 2010 aged 52. McLeod commented that his victory was "the best win of [his] career, to beat Judd Trump on centre stage is brilliant."

In an all-Chinese match, fourth seed Ding Junhui defeated debutant Zhou Yuelong 10–5 to reach the last 16. Ali Carter lost 7–10 in a tense encounter with 2006 world champion Graeme Dott, which Carter blamed on his poor start to the match. The 2010 world champion Neil Robertson made his 500th career century during his 10–4 first round win over Noppon Saengkham. In his first-round loss to Liang Wenbo, Stuart Carrington became only the fifth player, after John Higgins, Ronnie O'Sullivan, Mark Selby, and Neil Robertson, to make century breaks in three consecutive frames in a World Championship match; Liang won the match 10–7. Xiao Guodong defeated Wales' sole representative Ryan Day 10–4, which Day referred to as "embarrassing". This was the first event since 1969 where the second round contained no Welsh players.

Seven former world champions progressed to the second round: Selby, Bingham, O'Sullivan, Higgins, Robertson, Dott and Shaun Murphy. Ebdon was the only former champion in the main draw not to reach the last 16. None of the five debutants made it to the second round.

Second round

The second round of the championship took place from 20 to 24 April 2017, matches being played as best-of-25 frames over three sessions. At this stage, 12 of the 16 seeded players remained in the competition. Kyren Wilson advanced to his second consecutive World Championship quarter-final by defeating third seed Stuart Bingham 13–10. Five-time world champion Ronnie O'Sullivan beat Shaun Murphy 13–7, to set up his 18th quarter-final appearance at the Crucible. Having dispatched Zhou Yuelong in the first round, Ding Junhui played in a second consecutive all-Chinese match, defeating fellow countryman Liang Wenbo 13–12.

Four-time world champion John Higgins defeated Mark Allen 13–9, having trailed 3–5 after the first session. Stephen Maguire defeated Rory McLeod 13–3 with a session to spare to reach his first World Championship quarter-final since 2012. Maguire was the only unseeded player to progress to the quarter-finals. Defending champion Mark Selby defeated Xiao Guodong 13–6, commenting afterwards, "I don't feel as though I have peaked". Marco Fu won 13–11, after his opponent Neil Robertson missed the final black in the 24th frame which would have sent their match into a deciding frame.

Quarter-finals

The quarter-finals were played on 25 and 26 April 2017, as best-of-25 frames matches divided over three sessions. John Higgins won all three sessions of his match against Kyren Wilson and triumphed 13–6, to advance to his first semi-final since winning the event in 2011. With the score tied at 3–3 in the first session, Wilson miscued and split his cue tip, requiring a 15-minute break to carry out the repair. The two players would meet in the semi-finals of the following year's tournament, which Higgins won 17–13.

Defending champion Mark Selby defeated Marco Fu 13–3 with a session to spare. Selby's victory included a break of 143 in frame 15, which BBC commentator Stephen Hendry described as "one of the best [breaks] I've ever seen." After the match, Fu commented that Selby was "unplayable at times" and predicted that he would win the championship.

Ding Junhui defeated Ronnie O'Sullivan 13–10 in their quarter-final encounter. Ding developed an early 3–0 lead, but O'Sullivan fought back to level the first session at 4–4. Ding dominated the second session and opened up a 10–6 overnight lead. O'Sullivan took the first two frames of the final session to reduce his deficit to 8–10; the next four frames were shared equally, before Ding concluded the match in frame 23. O'Sullivan attempted a 147 maximum break in frame 20, but he ran out of position after potting the 13th red and was forced to take the pink instead of the black; his consequent  of 146 was the highest break of the championship.

Stephen Maguire was defeated 9–13 by Barry Hawkins, who reached his fourth Crucible semi-final in five years. Hawkins led 9–7 after the first two sessions, but Maguire took the next two frames—including a 135 clearance in frame 17—to tie the match at 9–9. Hawkins then won the next four frames straight to round out the match.

Semi-finals

The semi-finals, which took place from 27 to 29 April 2017, were played as best-of-33 frames matches divided over four sessions. A single table was used for both matches, successive sessions of play alternating between the two semi-finals. Defending champion Mark Selby played fourth seed Ding Junhui in the first semi-final, which was a rematch of the previous year's final. Selby held the lead for most of the match, before Ding drew level at 12–12 after three sessions. Selby then won four of the next five frames, to lead 16–13, requiring just one more frame to win the match. Ding persevered to win two further frames, before Selby scored a break of 72 to triumph 17–15.

Sixth seed John Higgins played seventh seed Barry Hawkins in the other semi-final. Higgins held the lead after each of the first three sessions, at 5–3, 10–6, and 16–8, before winning the match 17–8 in the first frame of the final session. World Snooker described his semi-final win as a "demolition". With the victory, Higgins qualified for his first World Championship final in six years and his sixth overall, the first being 19 years previously when he won his first world title in 1998.

Final

The final was played on 30 April and 1 May 2017 between first seed Mark Selby and sixth seed John Higgins. It was a best-of-35 frames match, spread over four sessions. This final was a rematch of the 2007 World Championship final, where Higgins had defeated Selby 18–13. In reaching the 2017 final, Higgins became the second-oldest Crucible world finalist at 41 years and 11 months, behind Ray Reardon who had played in the 1982 final aged 49. The other quadragenarians to have played in a world final at the Crucible were John Spencer and Terry Griffiths.

Higgins led 6–2 after the first session and 10–4 during the second, before finishing the first day 10–7 ahead. Selby fought back on the second day to win six of the first seven frames, and he was leading 13–11 by the end of the third session. The next six frames were shared equally and Selby maintained his two-frame lead at 16–14. Higgins then won the frame to take the score to 16–15. After compiling a 131 break in frame 32, Selby won the championship with a break of 75 in frame 33, bringing the final match score to 18–15.

Selby had achieved his victory after falling behind by six frames at the end of the first day's play. He became the fourth player (after Steve Davis, Stephen Hendry, and Ronnie O'Sullivan) to defend the world title in the Crucible era. He also became the third player (after Hendry and Ding Junhui) to win five full ranking titles in a single season, the first player to win the China Open and the world title back-to-back, and the first player to win over £1,000,000 across the two-year rolling prize money list. In reaching the final, Higgins moved to second in the world rankings, behind Selby.

Main draw
The numbers in parentheses beside some of the players are their seeding ranks. Match winners are shown in bold.

Qualifying
Qualifying for the 2017 World Snooker Championship took place from 5 to 12 April 2017, at the Ponds Forge International Sports Centre in Sheffield. There were 128 competitors who took part in the three qualifying rounds; the 16 winners of the third round matches progressed to the main stage of the tournament at the Crucible Theatre, also in Sheffield. All qualifying matches were played as best-of-19 frames. The 128 players that entered the qualifying competition included tour players ranked outside the top 16, and 16 amateur players, all of whom achieved success through the WPBSA qualifying criteria. The following amateur players were invited to compete:
 Home Nations NGB qualifiers:  Jackson Page, Tyler Rees, Ross Vallance, Chris Totten,  Jordan Brown,  Patrick Wallace,  Jamie Bodle,  Wayne Townsend
 2016 IBSF World Under-21 Snooker Championship winner: Xu Si
 2017 EBSA European Snooker Championship runner-up: Andres Petrov (tournament won by Chris Totten, who had already qualified)
 2017 EBSA European Under-21 Snooker Championship winner: Alexander Ursenbacher
 EBSA Order of Merit 2016/17: Gerard Greene, Zack Richardson
 2017 World Seniors Championship winner: Peter Lines
 2016 WLBS World Women's Championship winner: Reanne Evans
 2017 WLBS World Women's Championship winner: Ng On-yee

The winner of the 2016 IBSF World Snooker Championship, Soheil Vahedi of Iran, was also invited but could not obtain a visa in time to compete. Two amateur players, England's Andy Hicks and Poland's Adam Stefanów, were invited to replace the absent professional players Jamie Burnett and Rouzi Maimaiti. Hicks and Stefanów were selected from the 2016 Q School Order of Merit, as the top-ranked players that had not already qualified for the tournament.

Round 1
The results of the first round of qualifying are given below; of the 128 players that entered, 64 progressed to the second round.

Round 2
The results of the second round of qualifying are given below; 32 players progressed to the third and final qualifying round.

Round 3
The results of the third round of qualifying are given below. The 16 winners advanced to the main stages of the competition, where they met the 16 seeded players in the first round.

Century breaks

Main stage centuries
There were 74 century breaks made by 23 players in the main stage of the event. Ronnie O'Sullivan compiled the highest break of the tournament, a 146, in his quarter-final loss to Ding Junhui.

 146, 128, 124, 122, 111, 104  Ronnie O'Sullivan
 143, 139, 132, 131, 128, 121, 101, 100  Mark Selby
 141, 135, 129, 127, 124, 120, 120, 111  John Higgins
 139, 136, 132, 132, 128, 128, 120, 117, 117, 113, 111, 110, 103  Ding Junhui
 137, 122  Stuart Bingham 
 135, 114  Stephen Maguire
 132, 126, 115  Barry Hawkins
 131  Xiao Guodong
 130  Liang Wenbo
 129, 116, 105, 102, 100, 100  Mark Allen
 125  Ryan Day
 124, 107, 101  Stuart Carrington
 118, 115, 109, 105  Marco Fu
 118, 112, 109  Shaun Murphy
 113, 105  Neil Robertson
 111, 104  Ali Carter
 110  Kyren Wilson
 109  Luca Brecel
 109  Yan Bingtao
 108, 100  Martin Gould
 105  Graeme Dott
 104  David Grace
 103, 100  Gary Wilson

Qualifying stage centuries
There were 84 century breaks made by 51 players in the qualifying stages of the championship. The highest was a maximum break compiled by Gary Wilson in frame four of his first qualifying round win over Josh Boileau.

 147, 130, 113, 109, 107, 102, 102, 101  Gary Wilson
 144, 104  Michael White
 140, 103  Joe Perry
 140  Sam Craigie
 137, 128, 111  Xiao Guodong
 137, 107, 103  David Grace
 137  Jack Lisowski
 136, 129, 108  Martin Gould
 135, 104  Hossein Vafaei
 135, 102  Yu Delu
 134, 122  Noppon Saengkham
 133, 105  Jamie Jones
 133  Peter Lines
 132  Liam Highfield
 131, 129, 104  Stephen Maguire
 131, 106  Chris Wakelin
 131  Zhou Yuelong
 130, 100  Fergal O'Brien
 129  Ben Woollaston
 128, 115, 100  Mark Davis
 127  Anthony Hamilton
 127  Tian Pengfei
 125, 109  Sanderson Lam
 123  Paul Davison
 122, 121, 120, 106  Dominic Dale
 122  Jimmy White
 120, 105  Sunny Akani
 119  Peter Ebdon
 118  Robin Hull
 117, 105  Yan Bingtao
 114  Alexander Ursenbacher
 112  Mei Xiwen
 112  Mark Williams
 111, 102  Zhang Anda
 108  Ken Doherty
 108  Michael Wild
 107  Jamie Cope
 107  Li Hang
 107  Robert Milkins
 106  Jimmy Robertson
 105  Tom Ford
 105  David Gilbert
 105  Robbie Williams
 104  Stuart Carrington 
 103  Michael Georgiou
 103  Alan McManus
 102  Nigel Bond
 101, 101  Michael Holt
 101  Kritsanut Lertsattayathorn
 101  Sydney Wilson
 100  Luca Brecel

Notes

References

External links
 

2017
World Championship
2017 in English sport
Sports competitions in Sheffield
April 2017 sports events in the United Kingdom
May 2017 sports events in the United Kingdom